Gideon Kleinman is a former Israeli footballer who is mostly known for playing in Maccabi Netanya in the 1970s and early 1980s.

Honours
Championships
1973–74, 1977–78, 1979–80
State Cup
1978
Israeli Supercup
1974, 1978, 1980
UEFA Intertoto Cup
1978, 1980

References

1955 births
Living people
Israeli footballers
Maccabi Netanya F.C. players
Maccabi Hadera F.C. players
Association football midfielders